Martin Kaut (born October 2, 1999) is a Czech professional ice hockey forward  for the San Jose Sharks in the National Hockey League (NHL). He was selected by the Colorado Avalanche in the first round, 16th overall, in the 2018 NHL Entry Draft.

Playing career

Czech Republic
Kaut played junior hockey with youth club, HC Žďár nad Sázavou, through to the under-16 level. As a natural Winger, Kaut showed initial  potential for a nose to the net by scoring the most goals on the Czech U16 team with 37 in the 2014–15 season.

Signed to professional club, HC Dynamo Pardubice, Kaut played in their junior U18 and U20 teams, before making his professional debut as a 17-year old in the Czech Extraliga during the 2016–17 season. He registered 1 assist in 26 games, while splitting the season with the under-20 team, registering 16 points in 22 games. As an emerging NHL eligible draft prospect, he was selected 24th overall in the 2017 CHL Import Draft by major junior club, the Brandon Wheat Kings of the Western Hockey League (WHL).

Opting to continue with professional career, and in his first full season with Dynamo Pardubice in 2017–18, Kaut improved his overall impact, showing a strong two-way ability in scoring 9 goals and adding 7 assists for 16 points as the youngest player on the team's roster. He finished the season with the second most points of any player under the age of 20 in the league, only trailing Martin Nečas. Elevating his play in the post-season, Kaut finished tied second on Pardubice in scoring with 5 points in 7 playoff contests.

Kaut's standout play in the Extraliga playoffs and World Juniors led to a rise in the winger's draft stock, climbing from eleventh on the NHL Central Scouting Bureau International skater ranks to finishing the year fourth on the list. However, with the intention to impress at the NHL Scouting Combine, Kaut was unable to participate due to a possible congenital heart condition that was discovered in testing and required minor ablation surgery. Having recovered from surgery, discovering he didn't have the condition that was initially diagnosed, Kaut was able to attend the 2018 NHL Entry Draft and was selected in the first-round, 16th overall, by the Colorado Avalanche.

Colorado Avalanche
On July 5, 2018, Kaut was signed a three-year entry-level contract with the Colorado Avalanche. In leaving the Czech Republic, Kaut attended his first training camp with the Avalanche in 2018, and quickly adapted to the North American game through the pre-season, playing in contests alongside Tyson Jost and Alexander Kerfoot. Eligible to continue his development in the American Hockey League due to his European status, Kaut was assigned to primary affiliate, the Colorado Eagles for their inaugural 2018–19 season in the AHL on September 27, 2018.

He made his North American debut and collected an assist in the Eagles opening night overtime defeat to the Chicago Wolves on October 5, 2018. He later notched his first goal in his sixth AHL game, a 5–3 victory over the Ontario Reign on October 20, 2018. In playing on the top two scoring lines with the Eagles, Kaut scored 12 points through 26 games before he was loaned by the Avalanche to participate in the 2019 World Junior Championships on December 21, 2018. Kaut returned to the Eagles following the Tournament, finishing his rookie season with 12 goals and 26 points in 63 regular season games. He recorded his first two playoffs goals in a 5–2 defeat to the Bakersfield Condors on April 27, 2019, unable to prevent the Eagles suffering a 3–1 series defeat in the first-round.

In the following 2019–20 season, after participating in the Avalanche's 2019 training camp, Kaut was among the final two rounds of cuts reassigned to continue his development in the AHL. He opened the season with the Eagles going scoreless in 7 games before suffering a concussion against the San Jose Barracuda on October 26, 2019. He returned after two months and regained his scoring touch in collecting 16 points in 24 games in return from his concussion before earning his first NHL recall by the injury-hit Avalanche on February 18, 2020. He made his NHL debut with the Avalanche playing on the fourth-line in a 3–1 victory over the New York Islanders at the Pepsi Center on February 19, 2020. He registered his first NHL point, a game-winning assist on a J. T. Compher goal, in his next game with the Avalanche of 1–0 win over the Anaheim Ducks on February 22, 2020. In his fourth game, Kaut notched his first NHL goal against Carter Hutton, in a 3–1 victory over the Buffalo Sabres on February 26, 2020. He helped the Avalanche to seven straight victories in his first seven games before he was later returned to Colorado Eagles, due to contract considerations, on March 5, 2020.

Approaching the off-season with the 2020–21 delayed North American season, Kaut remained in the Czech Republic, loaned by the Colorado Avalanche to resume playing with former club, HC Dynamo Pardubice of the ELH on 12 September 2020. In Pardubice's opening home game, Kaut recorded the overtime winner in a 3–2 victory over HC Plzeň on 20 September 2020. Concentrating on playing a two-way physical game, Kaut recorded 1 point in 4 games before the season was paused due to the rising continuance of the COVID pandemic in the Czech Republic. With his initial loan agreement set to expire in early November and with the need to continue to play, Kaut was reassigned by the Avalanche, leaving Dynamo Pardubice to join Swedish HockeyAllsvenskan club, Modo Hockey, on 26 October 2020. Kaut recorded a goal and an assist through his first 4 games with Modo before suffering injury. In returning to health, Kaut played 8 games in total collecting 5 points, before his loan was ended and he returned to North America to prepare for training camp with the Avalanche.

Approaching his fifth year within the Avalanche organization in the  season, Kaut failed to make the opening night roster and was familiarly re-assigned after clearing waivers to AHL affilaite, the Colorado Eagles. He was soon recalled to the Avalanche due to a spate of injuries and appeared in a career high 27 games in registering just 1 goal and 3 points in a depth forward role.

San Jose Sharks
On 25 January 2023, while on assignment with the Eagles, Kaut's tenure with the Avalanche ended as he was traded alongside Jacob MacDonald to the San Jose Sharks in exchange for Matt Nieto and fellow 2018 first-round pick, Ryan Merkley. He was immediately re-assigned to the Sharks AHL affiliate, the San Jose Barracuda.

International play

 

Kaut first represented the Czech Republic at the 2016 World U-17 Hockey Challenge, in a 7th-place finish. Kaut had a goal and three assists in five games as a 16-year old and a member of his country's first gold-medal at the 2016 Ivan Hlinka Memorial Tournament.

Kaut emerged as a standout at the 2018 World Junior Championships in Buffalo, New York, where he ranked fourth on the team with 7 points in 7 games en route to a fourth-place finish at the tournament. His five assists were tied for third on the team and second among the Czech forwards, while playing on the top scoring line alongside Filip Zadina and Martin Nečas.

Kaut returned for the 2019 World Junior Championships in Vancouver, British Columbia, after he was loaned during his first professional North American season within the Colorado Avalanche organization. In the opening game of the Tournament, Kaut scored and added the primary assist in a 2–1 overtime victory against Switzerland, to be named player of the game, on December 26, 2018. Helping the Czechs advance to the knockout rounds, Kaut scored the lone goal in a 3-1 elimination defeat to the United States on January 2, 2019. He was selected among the top 3 players for the Czech team in a 7th-place finish.

Career statistics

Regular season and playoffs

International

References

External links

1999 births
Living people
Colorado Avalanche draft picks
Colorado Avalanche players
Colorado Eagles players
Czech ice hockey right wingers
Czech expatriate ice hockey players in the United States
Czech expatriate ice hockey players in Sweden
HC Dynamo Pardubice players
Ice hockey people from Brno
Modo Hockey players
National Hockey League first-round draft picks
San Jose Barracuda players
San Jose Sharks players